2011 BEKO Super Cup was a mini-tournament held between 4 European national basketball teams in preparation for the FIBA EuroBasket 2011. The tournament was held from August 19 until August 21 in Bamberg, Germany. Greece won the tournament with a 3–0 record.

Participants 
  - host nation

Standings 

|}

Results 

FIBA EuroBasket 2011
International basketball competitions hosted by Germany
2011–12 in German basketball
2011–12 in Greek basketball
2011–12 in Turkish basketball
2011–12 in Belgian basketball